Udaipur is one of the 200 Legislative Assembly constituencies of Rajasthan state in India. It is in Udaipur district and is a part of Udaipur Lok Sabha Constituency.

Members of Legislative Assembly

Election results

2018

See also
List of constituencies of the Rajasthan Legislative Assembly
Udaipur district

References

Udaipur district
Assembly constituencies of Rajasthan